Ooni Osinlade was the 35th Ooni of Ife, a paramount traditional ruler of Ile Ife, the ancestral home of the Yorubas. He succeeded Ooni Aribiwoso and was succeeded by  
Ooni Adagba.

References

Oonis of Ife
Yoruba history